Gail Levin may refer to:
Gail Levin (art historian) (born 1948), an American art historian
Gail Levin (filmmaker) (1946–2013), an American documentary filmmaker